Jan Paul Vandenbroucke (born March 8, 1950 in Leuven, Belgium) is a Belgian epidemiologist and physician known for his work in clinical epidemiology. Trained as an internist, he began teaching at Leiden University Medical Center in 1987, and was the head of their Clinical Epidemiology department from then until 1999. He is a member of Academia Europaea and the Royal Netherlands Academy of Arts and Sciences since 1996. In 2006, he was named an Academy Professor by the Royal Netherlands Academy of Arts and Sciences.

References

External links
Faculty page

1950 births
Living people
Physicians from Leuven
Belgian epidemiologists
Belgian general practitioners
Academic staff of Leiden University
Members of Academia Europaea
Members of the Royal Netherlands Academy of Arts and Sciences